Radio 100 most commonly refers to:

Radio 100 (Denmark), a Danish radio channel
Radio 100 (Germany), a radio station from West Berlin